War War War is the third album by Country Joe McDonald.  The lyrics for the songs on the album were based upon the poetry of Robert William Service (January 16, 1874 – September 11, 1958), who was sometimes referred to as "the Bard of the Yukon".

The album was released in October 1971 by Vanguard Records (VSD 79315) and reissued in February 1995 by One Way Records (OW 30995). Recording took place in Vanguard Studios located in New York City.

Because the album has been out of print for many years, Country Joe McDonald released a live album with the same track listing in 2007 called War War War Live.

Track listing
All tracks composed by Joe McDonald from the poems of Robert W. Service

Reception

The album reached number 185 on the 1971 Billboard pop albums chart in 1971.

Personnel
Country Joe McDonald - vocals, guitar, harmonica, tambourine, organ, vocal harmony

Production
Producer - Country Joe McDonald
Engineer - Captain Jeff Zaraya

References

External links
 Information at Country Joe McDonald's website

1971 albums
Country Joe McDonald albums
Vanguard Records albums
Adaptations of works by Robert W. Service